Mendua is an Indonesian web series produced by Screenplay Films and BBC Studios which premiered 17 December 2022 on Disney+ Hotstar. The series based on remake of the series Doctor Foster by Mike Bartlett. This series is directed by Pritagita Arianegara. Starring Adinia Wirasti, Chicco Jerikho and Tatjana Saphira.

Plot 
The life of Sekar, a successful doctor with a peaceful life because he has a small, happy family. She lives in an elite area of Jakarta with her husband, Ivan and their son, Dennis. The marriage has also been running for 15 years without encountering any major problems. However, a complicated situation occurs when Sekar accidentally notices her husband's suspicious movements. This suspicion sparked a big problem that Sekar had never imagined before. She has to face a dilemma full of problems because Ivan is having an affair. Sekar's life, which was initially calm and perfect, is shattered in an instant due to her husband's affair with a young socialite named Bella. Sekar finally tries to uncover Ivan's deception, which has so far been overlooked. However, that effort actually brought Sekar to a situation that was far from what he expected because it was full of betrayal. This condition triggers Sekar to do various unusual things that threaten his career, family, and even himself. Not only uncovering her husband's affair, Sekar also has to strategize to deal with the traitors around him.

Cast 
 Adinia Wirasti as Dr. Sekar Atmajaya
 Chicco Jerikho as Ivan Atmajaya
 Tatjana Saphira as Isabella Rijanto / Bella
 Bima Azriel as Dennis Atmajaya
 Widyawati as Rosmina Atmajaya
 Jolene Marie as Marsha Mahendra
 Winky Wiryawan as Rama Mahendra
 Melissa Karim as Safina Wijaya
 Dennis Adhiswara as Felix Ali
 Karina Salim as Jenny Lukman
 Morgan Oey as Gerry
 Ibrahim Risyad as Sam Darmawan
 Djenar Maesa Ayu as Dr. Alya Darmawan
 Tuti Kembang Mentari as Mbak Mini
 Agus Lemu as Neri
 Aida Nurmala as Erika Rijanto
 Pierre Gruno as Rizal Rijanto
 Joshua Rundengan as Billy Rijanto
 Dwi Yan as Hakim Ketua 
 Indra Brasco as Kuasa Hukum Sekar
 Miranty Dewi as Nunik

References

External links 
 

2022 web series debuts
2023 web series endings
Doctor Foster